The Royal Steward Inscription, known as KAI 191, is an important Proto-Hebrew inscription found in the village of Silwan outside Jerusalem in 1870. After passing through various hands, the inscription was purchased by the British Museum in 1871.

The inscription is broken at the point where the tomb's owner would have been named, but biblical scholars have conjectured a connection to Shebna, on the basis of a verse in the Bible mentioning a royal steward who was admonished for building a conspicuous tomb.

It was found by Charles Simon Clermont-Ganneau, about a decade prior to the Siloam inscription, making it the first ancient Hebrew inscription found in modern times. Clermont-Ganneau wrote about three decades later: "I may observe, by the way, that the discovery of these two texts was made long before that of the inscription in the tunnel, and therefore, though people in general do not seem to recognise this fact, it was the first which enabled us to behold an authentic specimen of Hebrew monumental epigraphy of the period of the Kings of Judah."

The text is considered to have a "remarkable" similarity to that of the Tabnit sarcophagus from Sidon.

Discovery

The inscribed lintel was found by French archaeologist, Charles Simon Clermont-Ganneau in 1870 above the entrance to a home in Silwan, a historical Palestinian village south of Jerusalem. Clermont-Ganneau first published the discovery in the Quarterly Statement of the Palestinian Exploration Fund, but with little detail:
Hebrew inscription in Phoenician characters. This inscription, discovered by myself several months ago, is the only monumental text which goes back to the time of the kings of Judah. It belongs authentically, by the very position which it occupies, to the history of Jerusalem. I cannot yet publicly point out its origin, in order not to interfere with the steps taken for its preservation. I will confine myself to saying that it has probably a religious signification, as is proved by the words beit and Baal, which are very distinctly to be read.

Clermont-Ganneau arranged for the inscription to be purchased and removed by the British Museum one year after its discovery. Almost thirty years later, in 1899, he published a detailed description of the discovery.

Inscription text
The limestone inscription was so severely damaged that it has not been possible to completely decipher the script. The writing is in Biblical Hebrew in the Paleo-Hebrew script – at the time of its discovery the script was referred to as "Phoenician letters" – and can be dated to the seventh century BCE.

The three words "אשר על הבית" gave rise to the English translation "royal steward", although this is not a literal translation – the three words literally mean simply "which… on… the house". Using parallels to Biblical passages it has been variously translated "upon the house", "steward of the house" or "governor of the house".

The "maidservant" is referred to by the Hebrew ‘amatah, equivalent to the term "handmaiden" used to refer to concubines at various points in the Torah.

Shebna
The royal steward or court chamberlain was a powerful figure in Ancient Judah. According to the Book of Isaiah, the royal steward appointed by King Hezekiah was called Shebna and he was admonished for building himself too grandiose a tomb. Although the name of the royal steward is broken at the point where the official is named, it has been conjectured on the basis of the biblical verse that this monumental inscription originates from the tomb of Shebna.

Clermont-Ganneau speculated in 1899 that the tomb could be that of the Shebna mentioned in Isaiah, but described the idea as a "sanguine illusion". In the early 1950s, the idea was suggested again by Yigael Yadin, the Israeli Army Chief of the General Staff, who was later to become an archaeologist. Nahman Avigad assessed the proposal, based upon the similarity of the text to that of the Siloam inscription and the fact that Biblical story of Shebna took place during the reign of King Hezekiah (715–687 BCE), describing it as a "highly conjectural suggestion".

See also
Isaiah 22
Siloam Inscription

References

Bibliography
 
 F. Frances (Ed), Treasures of the British Museum, London, 1972
 D. Colon, Ancient Near East Art, British Museum Press, London, 1995

7th-century BC inscriptions
1870 archaeological discoveries
Archaeological discoveries in the West Bank
Book of Isaiah
Middle Eastern objects in the British Museum
Hebrew inscriptions
KAI inscriptions
Ancient Israel and Judah
Siloam
Israel–United Kingdom relations